This is a list of Towns of Western Australia.

In Australia, including in the state of Western Australia, towns are commonly understood to be centres of population not formally declared to be cities or not within the urban area surrounding a city.

A
 Abbotts – abandoned
 Acton Park
 Agnew
 Ajana
 Albany (city)
 Aldersyde
 Allanson
 Amelup
 Amery
 Ardath
 Arrino
 Arrowsmith
 Arthur River
 Augusta
 Austin – abandoned
 Australind

B
 Baandee
 Babakin
 Badgebup
 Badgingarra
 Badjaling
 Bailup
 Bakers Hill
 Baldivis
 Balgo
 Balingup
 Balkuling
 Balladonia
 Ballidu
 Banksiadale – abandoned
 Bardi
 Barragup
 Beacon
 Beermullah
 Bejoording
 Belka
 Bencubbin
 Bendering
 Benger
 Benjaberring
 Beverley
 Big Bell – abandoned
 Bilbarin
 Bindi Bindi
 Bindoon
 Binningup
 Binnu
 Bodallin
 Boddington
 Bolgart
 Bonnie Rock
 Bonnie Vale
 Boranup
 Borden
 Bornholm
 Boscabel
 Bow Bridge
 Boxwood Hill
 Boyanup
 Boyup Brook
 Bremer Bay
 Bridgetown
 Broad Arrow – abandoned
 Brookton
 Broome
 Broomehill
 Bruce Rock
 Brunswick Junction
 Bullabulling
 Bullaring
 Bullfinch
 Bullsbrook
 Bulong
 Bunbury (city)
 Bungulla
 Bunjil
 Buntine
 Burakin
 Burekup
 Burracoppin
 Busselton (city)
 Byford

C
 Cadoux
 Caiguna
 Calingiri
 Camballin
 Cape Burney
 Capel
 Carbunup River
 Carcoola
 Carnamah
 Carnarvon
 Carrabin
 Cataby
 Cervantes
 Chidlow
 Chittering
 Clackline
 Cocklebiddy
 Collie
 Condingup
 Congelin
 Cookernup
 Coolgardie
 Coolup
 Coomberdale
 Coorow
 Coral Bay
 Corrigin
 Cossack – abandoned
 Cowaramup
 Cowcowing
 Cranbrook
 Crossman
 Cuballing
 Cue
 Cunderdin

D
 Dalwallinu
 Dalyup
 Dampier
 Dandaragan
 Dangin
 Dardanup
 Darkan
 Davyhurst
 Day Dawn – abandoned
 Deanmill
 Denham
 Denmark
 Derby
 Dinninup
 Dongara
 Donnelly River
 Donnybrook
 Doodlakine
 Dowerin
 Drummond Cove
 Dudinin
 Dumbleyung
 Dunsborough
 Duranillin
 Dwarda
 Dwellingup

E
 Eagle Bay
 Ejanding
 Elgin
 Elleker
 Eneabba
 Eradu
 Erikin
 Esperance
 Eucla
 Exmouth

F
 Ferguson
 Fitzroy Crossing
 Forrest
 Frankland

G
 Gabbin
 Gairdner
 Gascoyne Junction
 Geraldton (city)
 Gibson
 Gidgegannup
 Gingin
 Gleneagle – abandoned
 Gnarabup
 Gnowangerup
 Goldsworthy – abandoned
 Goomalling
 Gracetown
 Grass Patch
 Grass Valley
 Green Head
 Greenbushes
 Greenhills
 Greenough
 Guilderton
 Gutha
 Gwalia – abandoned

H
 Halls Creek
 Hamel
 Hamelin Pool
 Harrismith
 Harpertown 
 Harvey
 Herron
 Hester
 Highbury
 Hines Hill
 Holt Rock
 Hopetoun
 Horrocks
 Howatharra
 Hyden

I
 Ilkurlka
 Injidup
 Israelite Bay
 Isseka

J
 Jardee
 Jarrahdale
 Jarrahwood
 Jennacubbine
 Jennapullin
 Jerdacuttup
 Jerramungup
 Jigalong Community
 Jitarning
 Jurien Bay

K
 Kalannie
 Kalbarri
 Kalgan
 Kalgoorlie (city)
 Kambalda
 Kanowna – abandoned
 Karlgarin
 Karratha
 Karridale
 Katanning
 Kellerberrin
 Kendenup
 Keysbrook
 King River
 Kirup
 Kiwirrkurra
 Kojarena
 Kojonup
 Kondinin
 Kondut
 Koojan
 Kookynie – abandoned
 Koolyanobbing
 Koorda
 Korrelocking
 Kukerin
 Kulin
 Kulja
 Kumarina
 Kunjin
 Kununoppin
 Kununurra
 Kweda
 Kwelkan
 Kwolyin

L
 Lake Brown
 Lake Clifton
 Lake Grace
 Lake King
 Lancelin
 Latham
 Laverton
 Learmonth
 Ledge Point
 Leeman
 Leinster
 Leonora
 Little Grove
 Loongana
 Lower King
 Ludlow
 Lynton

M
 Madura
 Mandurah (city)
 Manjimup
 Manmanning
 Manypeaks
 Marble Bar
 Marchagee
 Margaret River
 Marradong
 Marvel Loch
 Maya
 Mayanup
 Meckering
 Meekatharra
 Menzies
 Merkanooka
 Merredin
 Metricup
 Miling
 Mingenew
 Minnenooka
 Mogumber, formerly Moore River Native Settlement
 Monkey Mia
 Mooliabeenie
 Moonyoonooka
 Moora
 Moorine Rock
 Morawa
 Moulyinning
 Mount Barker
 Mount Kokeby
 Mount Magnet
 Muchea
 Mukinbudin
 Mullalyup
 Mullewa
 Mundijong
 Mundrabilla
 Munglinup
 Muntadgin
 Muradup
 Myalup

N
 Nabawa
 Nanga Brook – abandoned
 Nangeenan
 Nangetty
 Nannine – abandoned
 Nannup
 Nanson
 Narembeen
 Narrikup
 Narrogin
 New Norcia
 Newdegate
 Newman
 Nornalup
 Norseman
 North Bannister
 North Dandalup
 North Yunderup
 Northam
 Northampton
 Northcliffe
 Nullagine
 Nungarin
 Nyabing

O
 Oakajee
 Ocean Beach
 Onslow
 Oombulgurri
 Ora Banda
 Osmington
 Ongerup

P
 Palgarup
 Pannawonica
 Pantapin
 Paraburdoo
 Paynes Find
 Paynesville – abandoned
 Peak Hill – abandoned
 Pemberton
 Peppermint Grove
 Perenjori
 Perth (Capital city of WA)
 Piawaning
 Piesseville
 Pindar
 Pingaring
 Pingelly
 Pingrup
 Pinjarra
 Pintharuka
 Pithara
 Point Samson
 Popanyinning
 Porlell – abandoned
 Porongurup
 Port Denison
 Port Gregory
 Port Hedland
 Preston Beach
 Prevelly
 Princess Royal – abandoned
 Port Kennedy

Q
 Quairading
 Quindalup
 Quindanning

R
 Ranford
 Ravensthorpe
 Ravenswood
 Rawlinna
 Redcliffe
 Redmond
 Reedy
 Regans Ford
 Rocky Gully
 Roebourne
 Roelands
 Rosa Brook
 Rothsay – abandoned

S
 Salmon Gums
 Sandstone
 Scaddan
 Seabird
 Serpentine
 Shackleton
 Shay Gap – abandoned
 Schotts
 Sir Samuel – abandoned
 South Hedland
 South Kumminin
 South Yunderup
 Southern Cross
 Stratham
 Secret Harbour

T
 Tambellup
 Tammin
 Tampa – Abandoned
 Tardun
 Telfer
 Tenindewa
 Tenterden
 The Lakes
 Three Springs
 Tincurrin
 Tom Price
 Toodyay
 Torbay
 Trayning
 Tuckanarra
 Tunney

U
 Useless Loop

V
 Varley
 Vasse
 Vivien

W
 Wagerup
 Wagin
 Walebing
 Walgoolan
 Walkaway
 Walpole
 Wandering
 Wannamal
 Warburton
 Warmun
 Waroona 
 Waterloo
 Watheroo
 Wedge Island
 Welbungin
 Wellstead
 Westonia
 Wialki
 Wicherina
 Wickepin
 Wickham
 Widgiemooltha
 Wilga
 Williams
 Wiluna
 Wilyabrup
 Windanya – Abandoned
 Windy Harbour
 Witchcliffe
 Wittenoom
 Wokalup
 Wongan Hills
 Wonnerup
 Woodanilling
 Woodarra
 Wooramel
 Wooroloo
 Worsley
 Wubin
 Wundowie
 Wyalkatchem
 Wyndham

X
 Xantippe

Y
 Yalgoo
 Yallingup
 Yanchep
 Yandanooka
 Yarloop
 Yarri 
 Yealering
 Yelbeni
 Yellowdine
 Yerecoin
 Yerilla
 Yilliminning
 Yoongarillup
 York
 Yorkrakine
 Yornaning
 Yornup
 Yoting
 Youanmi – abandoned
 Youndegin
 Yoweragabbie
 Yuna
 Yundamindera – abandoned
 Yunndaga – abandoned

Z
 Zanthus

References
 
 

Towns
Western Australia